Just a Matter of Time may refer to:

 Just a Matter of Time (novel), a 1973 novel by James Hadley Chase
 Just a Matter of Time (Marlena Shaw album), 1976
 Just a Matter of Time (Randy Rogers Band album), 2006

See also
 It's Just a Matter of Time (disambiguation)
 A Matter of Time  (disambiguation)